Serge Bec (August 27, 1933 – February 27, 2021) was a French poet, journalist, writer, and art critic.

Biography
Bec was born in Cavaillon and spent his childhood in Apt at the family flour mill. He attended Aix-Marseille University and the École supérieure de journalisme. After he completed his military service in Algeria, he became a journalist and art critic for Agence France-Presse. He served as Deputy Mayor of Culture of Apt from 1977 to 1983, and subsequently became director of the Luberon Regional Nature Park. In 1977, he became Editor-in-Chief of the journal Le Pays d’Apt. In 2009, he became Majoral of Félibrige.

Serge Bec died in Apt on February 27, 2021, at the age of 88.

Works

Poetry
Li Graio negro / Les Corneilles noires (1954)
Cants de l'estre fòu / Chants de l'être fou (1957)
Miegterrana / Méditerranée (1957)
Memòria de la carn, seguit de Auba / Mémoire de la chair, suivi de Aube (1960)
Auceus de l'ivern / Oiseaux de l'hiver (1960)
Galina blanca e marrit can / Poule blanche et chien méchant (1968)
Balada per Lili Fòng / Ballade pour Lilly Phong (1969)
Cronicas dau rèire-jorn / Chroniques à contre-jour (1978)
Sièu un païs / Je suis un Pays (1980)
Cants de nòstrei pòbles encabestrats / Chants de nos peuples enchevêtrés (1985)
Pouèmo de la Clarenciero I / Poèmes de la Clarencière (I) (1989)
Sesoun de guerro / Saison de guerre (1991)
Tres balado / Trois ballades (1993)
La nuech fendasclada / La nuit pourfendue (1994)
Entre Gascogne et Provence – Itinéraire en lettres d'Oc (1994)
Pouèmo de la Clarenciero II / Poèmes de la Clarencière (II) (1998)
Suito pèr uno eternita / Suite pour une éternité (2002)
Saume dins lo vènt / Psaume dans le vent (2006)
Femna mon Amor / Femme mon Amour (2008)

Novels
Repérages érotiques (1982)
Mémé, je ne veux pas que tu meures (1989)
L'otage des loups (1997)
Cagole (2001)
La malédiction d'Hadès (2005)

Photographic Books
Un village de Provence: Murs (1993)
Fêtes de Provence (1994)
Provence plurielle et singulière (1996)
Villages en Provence (1998)
Provence des lavandes (2001)

Guidebooks to Provence
Mini-guide des peintres du soleil (1969)
Mini-guide poétique du Luberon (1969)
Almanach des plaisirs du Luberon (1979)
Fantastique Pays d'Apt (1979)
Votre guide en Luberon (1986)
Le Luberon et sa région (1992)
Carnets d'un naturaliste amateur en Luberon (1997)

Songs and Recordings
Bec's poems were adapted into songs by René Sette. He also recorded his poems for Trésors d'Occitanie.

Awards
Grand Prix littéraire de Provence (2006)
"Jour de Serge Bec" at the University of Montpellier (April 2009)
Co-Sponsor of the Médiathèque d'Apt (2010)

References

1933 births
2021 deaths
20th-century French poets
People from Cavaillon
Occitan poets